Bourmont-entre-Meuse-et-Mouzon (literally Bourmont between Meuse and Mouzon) is a commune in the Haute-Marne department of eastern France. The municipality was established on 1 June 2016 by merger of the former communes of Bourmont (the seat) and Nijon. On 1 January 2019, the former commune Goncourt was merged into Bourmont-entre-Meuse-et-Mouzon.

See also 
Communes of the Haute-Marne department

References 

Communes of Haute-Marne